Joseph Dominick Pistone (born September 17, 1939), is an American former FBI agent who worked undercover as Donnie Brasco between September 1976 and July 1981, as part of an infiltration primarily into the Bonanno crime family, and to a lesser extent the Colombo crime family, two of the Five Families of the Mafia in New York City. Pistone was an FBI agent for 17 years, from 1969 until he resigned in 1986. The evidence collected by Pistone led to over 200 indictments and over 100 convictions of Mafia members—and some responsible for his infiltration were also killed by other mobsters.

Pistone was a pioneer in long-term undercover work. The FBI's former director, J. Edgar Hoover, who died in 1972, did not want FBI agents to work undercover because of the danger of agents becoming corrupted; Nonetheless, Pistone's work later helped convince the FBI that using undercover agents in lieu of relying exclusively on informants was a crucial tool in law enforcement. Pistone detailed his undercover experience in his 1988 book Donnie Brasco: My Undercover Life in the Mafia, the basis of the 1997 film about his life.

Early life and career
Pistone was born in 1939 in Erie, Pennsylvania. He is of Calabrian and Sicilian heritage, and grew up in Paterson, New Jersey, where he attended Eastside High School. He attended Paterson State College (now William Paterson University), obtaining a degree in anthropology in 1965.

He worked for a year as a teacher at Paterson School No. 10 and at the Office of Naval Intelligence for three years before being sworn into the FBI on July 7, 1969, and assigned to Jacksonville, Florida. In 1974, he was transferred to New York to work in the truck and hijack unit. Because of his ability to drive 18-wheeler trucks and bulldozers, he was eventually given undercover work infiltrating a vehicle theft ring, an assignment that resulted in over 30 arrests and a greater profile for Pistone within law enforcement.

FBI career as Donnie Brasco
In the spring of 1976, Pistone volunteered to infiltrate the Bonanno crime family, a job for which his fluency in Italian, Sicilian heritage, and the knowledge of mafia idiosyncrasies gleaned from his Paterson background were well suited. For the undercover operation, the false identity of Donald "Donnie" Brasco was created, with a backstory that involved work as a low-level jewel thief. After extensive preparation including FBI gemology courses, he went undercover as a jewel thief.

The operation was given the code name "Sun-Apple" after the locations of its two simultaneous operations: Miami ("Sunny Miami") and New York City ("The Big Apple"). After months of planning, in September 1976, Pistone started his undercover operation—an operation that was initially intended to last for around six months turned into several years. The FBI erased Pistone's name on office rolls and his personnel file; anyone who called asking for him would be told that no one by that name was employed there. His co-workers, friends, and informants had no idea what had happened to him. The original focus of the operation was to infiltrate big-time fences and truck hijackings that would in turn lead to the Mafia. While Pistone was undercover, he informed on the activities of the Mafia during some of the most volatile power struggles in organized crime.

Pistone worked his way into becoming an associate in Jilly Greca's crew from the Colombo family that was primarily involved in hijackings and robberies. After about six months, Pistone shifted to the Bonanno family by developing a relationship with Anthony Mirra. When Mirra was sent to prison, Pistone was tutored in the ways of the Mafia by Bonanno soldier Benjamin "Lefty" Ruggiero, whose captain was Mike "Mimi" Sabella. Pistone also had vending machine dealings with Frank Balistrieri of the Milwaukee crime family. After the 1979 murder of Carmine Galante, Pistone reported to captain Dominick "Sonny Black" Napolitano.

Pistone was responsible for a lucrative business venture in Holiday, Florida, when he opened and operated the King's Court Bottle Club. In Florida, Pistone worked with another FBI agent working undercover as Tony Rossi. Napolitano later contacted Pistone, whom he hoped to make a made man, to murder Alphonse "Sonny Red" Indelicato's son, Anthony "Bruno" Indelicato, who had previously evaded death after missing a May 1981 meeting which left Indelicato, Phillip Giaccone, and Dominick Trinchera dead.

The FBI then ordered the end of Pistone's operation. He wanted to continue until he was set to become a made man that December; Napolitano would lie about his "making his bones" (participating in a Mafia-ordered hit) to prove his loyalty. However, Pistone's superiors decided that the operation was becoming too dangerous and set an end date of July 26, 1981. Only after Pistone departed did FBI agents Doug Fencl, Jim Kinne, and Jerry Loar inform Napolitano that his longtime associate was an FBI agent. Pistone received a $500 bonus at the end of the operation.

Aftermath
Shortly thereafter, on August 17, 1981, Napolitano was murdered for having allowed an FBI agent to infiltrate the family; he was shot dead and his hands were cut off. Ruggiero was arrested by the FBI on August 29, 1981. Mirra was also later killed on February 18, 1982. About Napolitano's fate, Pistone had stated, "My intention in all of this was to put people in jail, not get them killed". In November 1982, Ruggiero, along with Nicholas Santora, Antonio Tomasulo, and Anthony "Fat Tony" Rabito, would be convicted in a six-week jury trial for racketeering conspiracy, receiving a 15-year prison sentence.

The Mafia put out a $500,000 contract on Pistone and kicked the Bonanno family off the Commission. FBI agents visited Mafia bosses in New York and advised them not to murder Pistone. The contract was dropped by Paul Castellano, who headed the Commission, as he thought killing a federal agent would "attract too much attention". Pistone publicly testified for the first time on August 2, 1982. The evidence collected by Pistone led to over 200 indictments and over 100 convictions of Mafia members. Although Pistone resigned from the FBI in 1986, he continued to testify when called upon, including at the Pizza Connection Trial.

While Pistone's infiltration decimated the Bonanno family, the family was consequently not a main target in the Mafia Commission Trial that saw the top leadership of the Five Families sent to prison, as the Bonannos had already been kicked off the Commission. By dodging this bullet, the family kept its leadership intact and was able to consolidate its power once again. The boss who led that resurgence, Joseph Massino, was convicted in 2004 of ordering Napolitano to be killed for allowing Pistone into the family.

Pistone lives in an undisclosed location with his wife Maggie and their three daughters, under assumed names. Pistone has been active as an author and consultant to worldwide law enforcement agencies, including Scotland Yard, and has been called to testify before the United States Senate as an expert on organized crime.

In September 2012, Pistone testified in Montreal, Quebec, at the Charbonneau Commission public inquiry into corruption, as an expert witness.

Media
Pistone detailed his undercover experience in his 1988 book Donnie Brasco: My Undercover Life in the Mafia. The book was the basis for the 1997 film Donnie Brasco, for which Pistone worked as a technical adviser, starring Johnny Depp as Pistone and Al Pacino as "Lefty" Ruggiero. It was also the basis for the short-lived 2000 television series Falcone, starring Jason Gedrick as Pistone (whose mob alias was changed from "Donnie Brasco" to "Joe Falcone" for legal reasons). Pistone was a consultant on Donnie Brasco to add authenticity to the fictionalized portrayals and settings. His life was used in an episode of FBI: The Untold Stories.

Pistone revisited his experiences as Donnie Brasco in his books The Way of the Wiseguy (2004) and Donnie Brasco: Unfinished Business (2007, co-authored with Charles Brandt). Pistone wrote a novel titled, The Good Guys (2005), with Joseph Bonanno's son, Salvatore "Bill" Bonanno. He has also written several works of fiction such as Deep Cover, Mobbed Up and Snake Eyes. He has served as an executive producer on movies relating to the Mafia, including the 2006 film 10th & Wolf. In 2008, Italian artist Rossella Biscotti interviewed Pistone in her video The Undercover Man. A play based on Donnie Brasco opened at the Pennsylvania Playhouse.

Pistone is featured in the eighth episode of UK history TV channel Yesterday's documentary series Mafia's Greatest Hits. A Secrets of the Dead episode, "Gangland Graveyard", features Pistone and his infiltration of the Mafia as part of the long-running investigation into the murder of three Mafia captains by Massino.

Pistone featured prominently in the 2013 mini-series Inside the American Mob. He features prominently in episode 1 "Stayin' Alive in the '70s" and is the main focus of episode 2, "Operation Donnie Brasco".

In May 2020, Pistone started a podcast called Deep Cover: The Real Donnie Brasco.

Notes

References

Bibliography

1939 births
American people of Italian descent
Bonanno crime family
Eastside High School (Paterson, New Jersey) alumni
Federal Bureau of Investigation agents
Living people
Organized crime memoirists
People from Paterson, New Jersey
People of the Office of Naval Intelligence
William Paterson University alumni
Writers from Erie, Pennsylvania
American writers of Italian descent
American memoirists
Non-fiction writers about organized crime in the United States
American male non-fiction writers
American podcasters
People of Sicilian descent
People of Calabrian descent